Farrodes is a genus of mayflies in the family Leptophlebiidae. Like all other members in Leptophlebiidae, Farrodes is characterized by a flat head and lanceolate shaped gills. A key feature in identifying it is the shape of the labrum, which is more rounded at the sides than its close relatives, Thraulodes.

References

Mayflies
Mayfly genera
Insects of Europe